A life hack (or life hacking) is any trick, shortcut, skill, or novelty method that increases productivity and efficiency, in all walks of life. The term was primarily used by computer experts who suffer from information overload or those with a playful curiosity in the ways they can accelerate their workflow in ways other than programming.

History
The original definition of the term "hack" is "to cut with rough or heavy blows". In the modern vernacular it has often been used to describe an inelegant but effective solution to a specific computing problem, such as quick-and-dirty shell scripts and other command line utilities that filtered, munged and processed data streams like e-mail and RSS feeds. The term was later extended to life hack, in reference to a solution to a problem unrelated to computers that might occur in a programmer's everyday life. Examples of these types of life hacks might include utilities to synchronize files, track tasks, remind oneself of events, or filter e-mail.

Popularization
The term life hack was coined in 2004 during the O'Reilly Emerging Technology Conference in San Diego, California by technology journalist Danny O'Brien to describe the "embarrassing" scripts and shortcuts productive IT professionals use to get their work done. 

O'Brien and blogger Merlin Mann later co-presented a session called "Life Hacks Live" at the 2005 O'Reilly Emerging Technology conference. The two also co-author a column entitled "Life Hacks" for O'Reilly's Make magazine which debuted in February 2005.

The American Dialect Society voted lifehack (one word) as the runner-up for "most useful word of 2005" behind podcast. The word was also added to the Oxford Dictionaries Online in June 2011.

See also 
 Hacker
 Hacker culture
 Security hacker
 Kitchen hack
 Jugaad – similar concept
 Kludge – similar concept
 Urawaza – similar concept
 FlyLady – housekeeping methodology
 Self-help – self-guided improvement—economically, intellectually, or emotionally—often with a substantial psychological basis
 Tim Ferriss – author
 Getting Things Done – book and time management method

In fiction 
 MacGyverisms
 Rube Goldberg – cartoonist

Techniques 
 43 Folders – time and file management system
 Hipster PDA – paper-based personal organizer
 Incremental reading – reading and learning method
 Pomodoro Technique – time management method
 Spaced repetition – long-term memorization principle
 Timeblocking – time management method

References

External links
Other examples of anti-technology life-hacks? | Ask MetaFilter
 Life Hacks talk from Danny O'Brien's Oblomovka

Hacker culture
Life skills
Personal life
2000s neologisms